The 2010 Summit League men's basketball tournament was the 2010 post-season tournament for The Summit League, an NCAA Division I athletic conference. It was won by conference regular season champion Oakland University. Oakland defeated #2 seed IUPUI in the finals 76–64 behind Derick Nelson's career high 38 points.

Nelson was named tournament MVP and was joined by teammates Keith Benson and Johnathon Jones on the All-Tournament Team. Robert Glenn, the leading scorer for the tournament and Alex Young, both of IUPUI rounded out the All-Tournament Team.

The tournament took place March 6–9, 2010 at Sioux Falls Arena in Sioux Falls, South Dakota.

Format
Out of the league's 10 teams, the top eight receive berths in the conference tournament.  After the 18-game conference season, teams are seeded by conference record, with tiebreakers used if necessary in the following order:
 Head-to-head competition
 Winning percentage vs. ranked conference teams (starting with #1 and moving down until the tie is broken)
 Ratings Percentage Index

Bracket

References

Tournament
Summit League men's basketball tournament
Basketball competitions in Sioux Falls, South Dakota
College basketball tournaments in South Dakota
Basketball